The USF Pro 2000 Championship Presented by Cooper Tires, formerly known as the Star Mazda Championship, Pro Mazda Championship, and later Indy Pro 2000 Championship, is an open-wheel racing series serving as the third step on the Road to Indy ladder system, between the U.S. F2000 Championship and Indy NXT. The series is sanctioned by the United States Auto Club and operated by Andersen Promotions. The series' champion is awarded a scholarship package to advance to Indy Lights competition for the following season. It competes on all open-wheel disciplines: road courses, street courses, and ovals.

The series' primary sponsor is the Goodyear Tire and Rubber Company via their Cooper Tires brand.

Many Pro Mazda graduates have gone on to race in top-tier open-wheel series, including American Formula One and NASCAR driver Scott Speed, IndyCar Series drivers Marco Andretti, Graham Rahal, James Hinchcliffe and Raphael Matos, and Rolex Sports Car Series and NASCAR driver Michael McDowell.

History

Background 
In 1983, a number of Formula Ford race cars powered by Mazda rotary engines were built by Hayashi Racing in Japan and imported to the United States for use by the Jim Russell Racing School. Enough cars were constructed to run a one-make series, the Mazda Pro Series, which began in 1984 at the Long Beach Grand Prix. In late 1984, following modifications to the cars' rollover structures to bring them in line with SCCA regulations, the so-called "Formula Russell" became so popular that numerous regional and divisional series were established by the Jim Russell Racing School.

Throughout the remainder of the 1980s, the series would gain six geographic divisions, each of which held their own championship. Early Mazda Pro Series competitors included Johnny O'Connell, Tommy Kendall, Mike Groff, Jeff Krosnoff, Norm Breedlove (son of Craig Breedlove), and Jon Beekhuis.

Foundation

1990s 
The Star Mazda Championship debuted in 1991 at Willow Springs, with Mark Rodrigues driving for Valley Motor Center (the constructor of the new 1990 chassis) claiming the inaugural win. The series gradually rose in importance on the American open-wheel racing landscape, as similar series such as the Barber Dodge Pro Series, Formula BMW Americas and Formula TR 2000 Pro Series ceased to operate, and later emerged as the primary series of its kind in the US.

1996 marked the first Star Mazda Championship race as a supporting event on an Indy Racing League weekend at the Phoenix 200 in March, and the first nationally televised Star Mazda Championship race. A new title sponsor was gained in 1999, making the series the Best Western Star Mazda Championship; the same year, it became a national professional series supporting the American Le Mans Series in its inaugural year. Joey Hand won five of the season's seven races and became the first driver in series history to win four races in a row. His prize included a new Mazda Miata road car.

2000s 

In 2001, the series was renamed the Star Mazda North American Championship Presented by Goodyear. Scott Bradley with World Speed Motorsports claimed the championship.

In 2003, the decision was made to utilize the Mazda RX-8's new 13B-MSP Renesis engine in a new Star Mazda car. Michael McDowell, Raphael Matos, and Adrian Carrio won the 2004, 2005, and 2006 championships, respectively.

2007 saw the formation of the Mazdaspeed Motorsports Driver Development Ladder, created to provide funding for champions in various Mazda-powered series to move up in class. Dane Cameron became the first Star Mazda champion to move up to the Atlantic Championship via the Mazdaspeed ladder. Joel Miller, the 2007 Skip Barber Pro Series Champion, became the first driver to move up to Star Mazda via the ladder in 2008.

Also in 2008, the Star Mazda Championship changed from rolling starts to standing starts to better prepare drivers for moving up to the Atlantic Championship and Champ Car World Series. Bias-ply racing slicks were abandoned in favour of radials designed specifically for the series by Goodyear (the sole tire provider for the national series since its inception). Both Goodyear and Mazda signed 5-year extensions of their title sponsorship of the series, through the end of the 2012 season.

In 2009, the Star Mazda car underwent its first major mechanical upgrade since it was introduced, which included a revised aerodynamic package and engine and suspension modifications. This optional upgrade was designed to lower the cost of competition and make the car easier to maintain and tune. That year, Raphael Matos became the first Star Mazda driver to race in each Mazda-powered series (Skip Barber, Star Mazda, Atlantic) and graduate to IndyCar. Oval races also rejoined the Star Mazda schedule for the first time since 2006; events included the Milwaukee Mile (winner Anders Krohn) and the Iowa Speedway (winner Peter Dempsey).

2010s 

In 2010, the Star Mazda Championship became a part of the IRL-sanctioned Mazda Road to Indy program, alongside the U.S. F2000 and Indy Lights. Through the Mazda Road to Indy program, the Star Mazda champion would receive funding to compete in Indy Lights the following year. The first Road to Indy race was held with all three series at the same event, the 2010 Grand Prix of St. Petersburg. Championship winner Conor Daly became the fourth driver in Star Mazda history (after Joey Hand in 1999, Michael McDowell in 2004, and Raphael Matos in 2005) to win four races in a row. Andretti Autosport joined the series in 2011, becoming the first team to compete at every level of the Road to Indy, including IndyCar. Tristan Vautier and Jack Hawksworth respectively won the 2011 and 2012 championships.

In December 2012, Star Mazda series founder Gary Rodriguez announced that the series had been sold to Dan Andersen's Andersen Promotions (which already sanctioned the Cooper Tires USF2000 Championship Powered by Mazda) and would be renamed the Pro Mazda Championship. Andersen previously owned a multi-car Star Mazda team, Andersen Racing. Following the departure of Mazda from the Road to Indy program at the end of 2018, the series was rebranded to the Indy Pro 2000, with Andersen Promotions maintaining its ownership of the series. Rookie Matthew Brabham of Andretti Autosport won the 2013 championship, with Gabby Chaves, Sage Karam, Jack Hawksworth, and Zach Veach advancing to Indy Lights.

in 2014, Juncos Racing's Spencer Pigot and Wayne Taylor Racing's Scott Hargrove battled down to the wire, with the championship title changing hands three times through the last race. Pigot, leading going into the race, came together with Hargrove and fell to the back of the field, only to see his championship hopes return when Hargrove's gearbox failed. Pigot took the title by 10 points and earned the Mazda scholarship into the Indy Lights series. Also graduating to Indy lights were Pigot's Juncos teammate Kyle Kaiser and Andretti Autosport's Shelby Blackstock.

Uruguayan Santiago Urrutia earned the 2015 title over American Neil Alberico with three wins and 10 podium finishes. Uruttia earned a $590,300 scholarship into the Indy Lights series, where he would be joined by Alberico and Andretti's Dalton Kellett.

Team Pelfrey teammates Pato O'Ward and Aaron Telitz battled throughout the 2016 season, with O'Ward taking six of the first seven victories and Telitz taking five of the final seven. Telitz's run of nine straight podium finishes (including a sweep of the victories at his home track of Road America) to end the season sealed his championship victory and the $601,700 scholarship into the Indy Lights series.

With the new Tatuus PM-18 car coming into use in 2018, increased incentives made the 2017 Pro Mazda Championship an attractive prospect. The scholarship to Indy Lights was increased to $790,300, the top three in the final championship standings would be awarded an Indy Lights test, and the top rookie would receive a Mazda road car. Juncos Racing's Victor Franzoni and Cape Motorsports' Anthony Martin enjoyed a spirited fight from the season opener, with the pair splitting the first 10 races of the season. At the Watkins Glen finale, Franzoni scored both victories to take the 2017 championship over Martin by 18 points. Franzoni graduated to Indy Lights with Juncos Racing, who fielded a team in the 2018 Indianapolis 500.

Cars

Star Formula Mazda 'Pro' (2004–2017) 

The Star Mazda Pro is an open-wheel formula racing car, designed, developed and built by Star Race Cars, for the North American Pro Mazda Championship spec-series, between 2004 and 2017.

Tatuus PM-18 (2018–2021) 

The Tatuus PM-18, used from 2018 through 2021, is based on the previous year's USF-17 chassis to help control teams' operational costs.
Chassis: Includes side impact panels, front and rear impact structures, HANS-compliant IndyCar head restraint, front and rear wheel tethers, upgraded uprights, and upgraded front bulkhead structure for US-specific ovals
Bodywork: Unique Indy Pro 2000 engine cover, carbon composite diffuser, adjustable dual-element rear wing and single plane carbon fiber front wing with adjustable flaps and Indy Pro 2000-specific front and rear endplates. All bodywork carbon fiber construction.
Electrical: Cosworth Omega L2 Plus Data Logger linked via CAN to Cosworth SQ6 ECU and GCU; option to upgrade to an Omega Pro at an added cost
Steering wheel: Cosworth CFW277 with integrated dash and gear change paddles
Fuel capacity:  
Fuel delivery:  Electronic fuel injection
Suspension: Dynamic DSSV two-way adjustable dampers and a range of adjustable front and rear anti-roll bars. Springs provided by Hyperco, with six spring rates available, interchangeable for front and rear axles. Upgraded front and rear uprights for US-specific ovals. Ride height, camber, and toe adjustment on both axles, with roll center, anti-squat, and anti-dive adjustments on the rear axle.

Tatuus IP-22 (2022) 
The Tatuus IP-22 is the replacement for the PM-18, now featuring a halo.

Champions

References

External links
 

 
Auto racing series in the United States
Auto racing series in Canada
Recurring sporting events established in 1991
International Motor Sports Association
Formula racing series
Mazda
One-make series
Road to Indy